Jeremiah Boswell (born October 6, 1982 in Salisbury, North Carolina) is a former American professional basketball player from Jasper, Georgia.  Jeremiah currently serves as a consultant for the NBA office while also remaining a partner in The Skill Factory in Atlanta, Georgia.  
Jeremiah was an All-State player in Georgia at Pickens County High School and continued his career by playing at Columbia University in New York City.  His professional playing career had stops in Brazil, Bulgaria, Switzerland, Hong Kong and Macedonia.  Jeremiah also worked with the NBA in China and India.

References

Notes
http://www.city-data.com/city/Jasper-Georgia.html
http://sportsillustrated.cnn.com/basketball/ncaa/men/players/20969/
http://www.eurobasket.com/player.asp?Cntry=MKD&PlayerID=39892
http://www.nba.com/global/asia/fitcamp_china_080731.html
https://www.nytimes.com/2005/02/12/sports/ncaabasketball/firstplace-penn-tops-columbia.html

1982 births
Living people
American expatriate basketball people in Brazil
American expatriate basketball people in Bulgaria
American expatriate basketball people in Hong Kong
American expatriate basketball people in North Macedonia
American expatriate basketball people in Switzerland
American men's basketball players
Basketball players from North Carolina
Columbia Lions men's basketball players
Guards (basketball)
People from Jasper, Georgia
People from Salisbury, North Carolina
Sportspeople from the Atlanta metropolitan area